Seven Oaks is a former provincial electoral division in the Canadian province of Manitoba.  It was created in 1956, and eliminated in 1989.

The riding was located in north-end Winnipeg, and was safe for the Cooperative Commonwealth Federation and New Democratic Party for most of its history.

List of provincial representatives

Election results

References

Former provincial electoral districts of Manitoba

Electoral_district